Pinoyscincus abdictus  is a species of skink, a lizard in the family Scincidae. The species is endemic to the Philippines. There are two recognized subspecies.

Habitat

Reproduction
The mode of reproduction of P. abdictus is unknown.

Subspecies
Two subspecies are recognized as being valid, including the nominotypical subspecies.
Pinoyscincus abdictus abdictus 
Pinoyscincus abdictus aquilonius 

Nota bene: A trinomial authority in parentheses indicates that the subspecies was originally described in a genus other than Pinoyscincus.

References

Further reading
Brown WC, Alcala AC (1980). Philippine Lizards of the Family Scincidae. Dumaguete, Philippines: Silliman University Natural Science Monograph Series. x + 246 pp. (Sphenomorphus abdictus, new species; S. abdictus aquilonius, new subspecies).
Linkem CW, Diesmos AC, Brown RM (2011). "Molecular systematics of the Philippine forest skinks (Squamata: Scincidae: Sphenomorphus): testing morphological hypotheses of interspecific relationships". Zoological Journal of the Linnean Society 163 (4): 1217–1243. (Pinoyscincus abdictus, new combination).

Pinoyscincus
Reptiles described in 1980
Taxa named by Walter Creighton Brown
Taxa named by Angel Chua Alcala